Harshman is a surname. Notable people with the surname include:

Jack Harshman (born 1927), American professional baseball pitcher
Margo Harshman (born 1986), American actress
Marv Harshman (1917–2013), American men's college basketball coach
Richard Harshman, professor at the University of Western Ontario
Steve Harshman, American politician